St. Johns is a census-designated place (CDP) in Maricopa County, Arizona, United States, located in the Gila River Indian Community. The population was 690 at the 2020 census, up from 476 at the 2010 census.

Geography 
St. Johns is on the south side of the Phoenix metropolitan area, on the northeast side of the valley of the Gila River. It is bordered to the southeast by the communities of Komatke and Gila Crossing.

Demographics 
As of the census of 2010, there were 476 people living in the CDP. The population density was 208.7 people per square mile. The racial makeup of the CDP was 3% White, <1% Black or African American, 95% Native American, 1% from other races, and 1% from two or more races. 4% of the population were Hispanic or Latino of any race.

Notes

Census-designated places in Maricopa County, Arizona
Gila River Indian Community